To Be or Not to Be is Nightmare's ninth full-length studio album. As all of their recent album releases, it came in three different versions, each with different artwork. The two limited editions (Types A & B), each come with different DVD tracks while the standard edition (Type C) came with one extra song. The album peaked #11 in the Oricon charts.

Track listing

Limited Edition A

Limited Edition B

NOTES

Single Information

Released: January 8, 2014
Oricon Chart Peak Position: #2

Dizzy
Released: August 21, 2013
Oricon Chart Peak Position: #13

References

2014 albums
Nightmare (Japanese band) albums
Avex Group albums
Japanese-language albums